Namcheybong, a small hamlet, located near Pakyong sub division at the Pakyong District of Sikkim state in India.

References

Villages in Pakyong district
 Pakyong district